The ʿAin Ghazal Statues are a number of large-scale lime plaster and reed statues discovered at the archeological site of ʿAin Ghazal in Jordan, dating back to approximately 9000 years ago (made between 7200 BC and 6250 BCE), from the Pre-Pottery Neolithic C period. A total of 15 statues and 15 busts were discovered in 1983 and 1985 in two underground caches, created about 200 years apart.

The statues are among the earliest large-scale representations of the human form, and are regarded to be among the most remarkable specimens of prehistoric art from the Pre-Pottery Neolithic B or C period. Their purpose remains uncertain, with archaeologists believing they may have been buried just after production, having possibly been made with that intent.

The ʿAin Ghazal Statues are today part of the collections of The Jordan Museum in Amman, with some also on display at the Citadel's Jordan Archaeological Museum, while a few have been loaned to foreign museums: one statue is in the Louvre Museum in Paris; parts of three other statues can be seen at the British Museum in London; and one of the figures with two heads is on show in the Louvre Abu Dhabi.

Description

The figures are of two types, full statues and busts. Some of the busts are two-headed. Great effort was put into modelling the heads, with wide-open eyes and bitumen-outlined irises. The statues represent men, women and children; women are recognizable by features resembling breasts and slightly enlarged bellies, but neither male nor female sexual characteristics are emphasized, and none of the statues have genitals, the only part of the statue fashioned with any amount of detail being the faces.

The statues were formed by modelling moist plaster from limestone on a reed core using plants that grew along the banks of the Zarqa River. The reed decayed over the millennia, leaving plaster shells with hollow interiors. Plaster becomes a water-resistant material when it dries and hardens. Heads, torsos and legs were formed from separate bundles of reeds which were then assembled and covered in plaster. The irises were outlined with bitumen and the heads were likely covered with some sort of wig.

They were nevertheless designed to stand up, probably anchored to the floor in enclosed areas and intended to be seen only from the front. The way the statues were made would not have permitted them to last long, and since they were buried in pristine condition it is possible that they were never on display for any extended period of time, but rather produced for the purpose of intentional burial.

Discovery and conservation

The site of ʿAin Ghazal was discovered in 1974 by developers who were building a highway connecting Amman to the city of Zarqa. Excavation began in 1982.
The site was inhabited during ca. 7250–5000 BC. In its prime era, during the first half of the 7th millennium BC, the settlement extended over 10–15 hectares (25–37 ac) and was inhabited by ca. 3000 people.

The statues were discovered in 1983. While examining a cross section of earth in a path carved out by a bulldozer, archaeologists came across the edge of a large pit 2.5 meters (8 ft) under the surface containing plaster statues. 
Excavation led by Gary O. Rollefson took place in 1984/5, with a second set of excavation under the direction of Rollefson and Zeidan Kafafi during 1993–1996.

A total of 15 statues and 15 busts were found in two caches, which were separated by nearly 200 years. Because they were carefully deposited in pits dug into the floors of abandoned houses, they are remarkably well-preserved. Remains of similar statues found at Jericho and Nahal Hemar have survived only in fragmentary state.

The pit where the statues were found was carefully dug around, and the contents were placed in a wooden box filled with polyurethane foam for protection during shipping. The statues are made of plaster, which is fragile especially after being buried for so long. The first set of statues discovered at the site was sent to the Royal Archaeological Institute in Great Britain, while the second set, found a few years later, were sent to the Smithsonian Institution in New York for restoration work. The statues were returned to Jordan after their conservation and can be seen in the Jordan Museum.

Part of the find is on loan in the British Museum. One statue is on loan at the Louvre Museum in Paris, and one of the figures with two heads is on show at the Louvre Abu Dhabi.

See also

 Jericho: Stone Age (Tell es-Sultan and its spring), for instance the Jericho Statue, from c. 9000 years ago
 Urfa Man, c. 9000 BC

References

Akkermans, Peter M.M.G. and Glenn M. Schwartz (2003), The archaeology of Syria: from complex hunter-gatherers to early urban societies (ca. 16,000–300 BC), Cambridge World Archaeology, Cambridge University Press, pp. 83ff.
Grissom, C.A. (2000), "Neolithic statues from 'Ain Ghazal: construction and form", American Journal of Archaeology 104, 25–45.
Rollefson, G.O. (1983), "Ritual and ceremony at Neolithic 'Ain Ghazal (Jordan)". Paléorient 9, 29–38.
Rollefson, G.O. (1984), "Early Neolithic statuary from 'Ain Ghazal (Jordan)", Mitteilungen der Deutschen Orient-Gesellschaft 116, 185–192.
Rollefson, G.O. (1986), "Neolithic 'Ain Ghazal (Jordan)- Ritual and ceremony II", Paléorient 12, 45–51.

8th-millennium BC works
7th-millennium BC works
1983 archaeological discoveries
1985 archaeological discoveries
Sculpture of the Ancient Near East
Archaeology of the Near East
Archaeological discoveries in Jordan
Plaster sculptures
Pre-Pottery Neolithic
Limestone statues